The San Marino national futsal team is controlled by the San Marino Football Federation, the governing body for futsal in San Marino and represents the country in international futsal competitions, such as the World Cup and the European Championships.

Competition history

FIFA Futsal World Cup

UEFA Futsal Championship

Current squad
The following players were called up to the squad for the UEFA 2024 FIFA Futsal World Cup qualification.

Notable players

Manuel Poggiali

References

External links
San Marino Football Federation

San Marino
National sports teams of San Marino
Futsal in San Marino